Wintereich is the third studio album by Finnish melodic death metal band Immortal Souls. It is Immortal Souls' first album released by the Dutch Dark Balance record label. It was released on June 1, 2007 in Europe.

Wintereich was recorded December 8, 2006 – February 18, 2007 at Studio Watercastle and Studio 3rd Track. The album was mixed by Arttu Sarvanne during February 5.–13, 2007. Wintereich was mastered by Svante Forsbäck at Chartmakers, Helsinki on March 8, 2007. The album layout was designed by Jeff Arwadi through Soundmind Graphics.

Wintereich is a story based concept album divided to 4 chapters. It continues on the band's melodic death metal style.

Track listing

Personnel 
 Aki Särkioja – vocals, bass
 Esa Särkioja – guitar
 Pete Loisa – guitar
 Juha Kronqvist – drums

References

External links
Wintereich at the band's homepage
Wintereich at Dark Balance's homepage

2007 albums
Immortal Souls albums
Facedown Records albums